Papachristos, also transliterated as Papahristos, is a Greek surname. Notable people with the surname include:

Andrew Papachristos, American sociologist
Kostas Papahristos (1916–1995), Greek actor
Stergios Papachristos (born 1989), Greek rower
Vaggelis Papachristos (born 1955), Greek politician

Greek-language surnames
Surnames